The 2000 Norwich City Council election took place on 4 May 2000 to elect members of Norwich City Council in England. This was on the same day as other local elections. 16 of 48 seats (one-third) were up for election.

Results summary

Ward results

Bowthorpe

Catton Grove

Coslany

Crome

Eaton

Heigham

Henderson

Lakenham

Mancroft

Mile Cross

Mousehold

Nelson

St. Stephen

Thorpe Hamlet

Town Close

University

References

2000 English local elections
2000
2000s in Norfolk
May 2000 events in the United Kingdom